Ramalingam Thyagraj (born 20 June 1950) is an Indian association football manager.

Coaching career
In the summer of 2011 Ramalingam signed for HAL SC in the top I-League.

References

Indian football managers
I-League managers
1950 births
Living people
Hindustan Aeronautics Limited S.C. managers